The Vortech A/W 95 is an American helicopter that was designed by Adams-Wilson as the Adams-Wilson Choppy and now produced in an improved version by Vortech of Fallston, Maryland. The aircraft is supplied in the form of plans for amateur construction. Vortech also supplies rotor blades and other key parts for the design.

Design and development

The standard engine used is the twin cylinder, air-cooled, two-stroke, dual-ignition  Rotax 503 engine. The aircraft fuselage is made from bolted-together aluminum tubing.

The manufacturer estimates the construction time as 250 hours.

Operational history
By 2005 the company reported that six aircraft were completed and flying.

By January 2015 two examples had been registered in the United States with the Federal Aviation Administration, although a total of three had been registered at one time.

Specifications (A/W 95)

See also
A-B Helicopters A/W 95
Showers Skytwister Choppy
List of rotorcraft

References

External links

A W 95
1990s United States sport aircraft
1990s United States helicopters
Homebuilt aircraft
Single-engined piston helicopters